The National Health Service (Amendment) Act 1949 (12, 13 & 14 Geo. 6, c. 93) is an Act of Parliament passed by the Parliament of the United Kingdom. The Act safeguarded the independence of GPs, who were allowed to treat private patients. It also proposed prescription charges of not more than 1s. for every National Health Service prescription. However, due to the intense opposition aroused by this proposal, the charges were not implemented till 1952.

The Prime Minister, Clement Attlee, announced on 24 October 1949: "There has been some excessive and unnecessary resort to doctors for prescriptions. This must be checked. A charge not exceeding one shilling, for each prescription will now be imposed. Arrangements will be made to relieve old age pensioners of this charge". The Minister of Health, Aneurin Bevan, told students at University College, London on 15 November: "Now that we have got the National Health Service based on free prescriptions, I shudder to think of the ceaseless cascade of medicine which is pouring down British throats at the present time. I wish I could believe that its efficacy was equal to the credulity with which it is being swallowed".

Notes

1949 in law
United Kingdom Acts of Parliament 1949
NHS legislation